The Men's individual pursuit LC2 track cycling event at the 2004 Summer Paralympics was competed from 18 to 19 September. It was won by Roberto Alcaide, representing .

Qualifying

18 Sept. 2004, 11:20

1st round

Heat 1
19 Sept. 2004, 14:00

Heat 2

Heat 3

Heat 4

Final round

19 Sept. 2004, 16:20
Gold

Bronze

References

M